E. J. "Bill" Simpson (March 14, 1940 – December 16, 2019) was an American racecar driver, but is best known as a pioneer in the racing safety business with his company Simpson Performance Products. He left Simpson Performance in a controversy surrounding Dale Earnhardt's death and started Impact! Racing. 

He was inducted into the Motorsports Hall of Fame of America in 2003.

Racing career
Simpson started in drag racing and SCCA Formula racing, eventually moving up to the USAC Championship Car series.  He raced in the 1968-1974 and 1976-1977 seasons, with 52 career starts. He qualified twentieth for the 1974 Indianapolis 500, and finished thirteenth. He finished in the top ten 11 times, with his best finish in 6th position in 1970 at Milwaukee. He decided to end his racing career in 1977, because he started to think about a telephone call that he needed to make while he was practicing at Indianapolis Motor Speedway.

Race safety advocate
In 1958, the 18-year-old Simpson broke both arms in a drag racing crash. Simpson later said, "Until then, I was like most drivers. The only time I thought about safety was after I'd been hurt. This time, I was hurt bad enough to do a lot of thinking."

Simpson's uncle owned a military surplus store, and suggested that he use a cross-form parachute to slow down the drag car. Simpson rented a sewing machine to create a prototype. Simpson got together with his friend dragster driver Mike Sorokin to test the prototype. They tested it by attaching it to a tow hitch, and dumping it from the back of the Chevy wagon while Sorokin drove down a street at 100 mph. The chute was too big for the car, and the car went airborne and crashed into a tree nursery. Both racers were jailed for the incident, but Simpson Drag Chutes was founded.

The first person to inquire about and use his parachute was "Big Daddy" Don Garlits. He evolved his business into a number of other safety items, such as gloves, helmets, restraints, and shoes. Simpson designed NASA's first umbilical cords, where he met Pete Conrad. Conrad introduced Simpson to DuPont product Nomex in 1967. Simpson used the product to create the first fire suit to be used in racing. He took the suit to the 1967 Indianapolis 500 where it was worn by 30 of 33 drivers. Simpson had developed over 200 racing safety products, including three generations of fire suits. Simpson has at several times demonstrated the suit's effectiveness, by being set on fire while wearing a suit.

Earnhardt controversy

Simpson Performance Products was involved in a controversy after the February 2001 death of Dale Earnhardt over whether the seat belt manufactured by the company had malfunctioned. NASCAR's investigation into the crash in part blamed seat belt failure. Simpson received death threats and bullets into his house, which led to his resignation in July 2001. Simpson sued NASCAR for $8.5 million defamation of character suit in February 2003. Simpson withdrew his lawsuit with an undisclosed settlement.

After leaving Simpson Performance Products, Bill Simpson realized that he still had much to contribute to improving driver safety.  After a one-year non-compete with Simpson Performance Products expired, he started Impact! Racing in 2002.  In addition to the drag chutes and Nomex underwear that Bill Simpson first introduced to racing, Impact! also manufactures restraints, helmets, race suits, shoes, and gloves for drag racing, NASCAR, Indycar, and other racing applications.  In 2010, Bill Simpson sold Impact! Racing to Robbie Pierce and MasterCraft Safety.

Football helmets
Simpson designed a lighter football helmet after attending an Indianapolis Colts football game and witnessing a player being hit in the head by the ball.  He partnered with Chip Ganassi to form Simpson Ganassi Helmets. They sold the company in 2018.

Career award
In 2003, he was inducted into the Motorsports Hall of Fame of America in the "at large" category.

Author
He was the author of the book Racing Safely, Living Dangerously, and its sequel, Through the Fire.

References

External links
Official website for Impact Race Products

1940 births
2019 deaths
American racing drivers
Deaths from cerebrovascular disease
Indianapolis 500 drivers
People from Hermosa Beach, California
Racing drivers from California
Sportspeople from Los Angeles County, California
Tasman Series drivers
Automotive safety pioneers
American automotive pioneers